Aleksandr Mikhailovich Krymov (23 October 1871 – 31 August 1917) was a Russian Imperial Lieutenant General, a military commander of Russo-Japanese War, World War I, and the Russian Revolution era.

On April 4, 1917, he was appointed acting commander of the 3rd Cavalry Corps, which included the Savage Division. He refused to accept the appointment of Military Minister by the Russian Provisional Government. On August 24, 1917 Commander-in-Chief Lavr Kornilov appointed Krymov commander of the detached Petrograd Army (отдельная Петроградская  армия) to secure the Russian capital of Petrograd.

Early life
Krymov was part of the nobility of the Warsaw Governorate.  Krymov participated in the Russo-Japanese War and World War I.

Kornilov affair

On 25 August, Kornilov's troops were given the order to occupy Petrograd, disperse the Soviet, and disarm the city's garrison in case of a Bolshevik uprising. He was given the order to advance on Petrograd to rescue the Provisional Government from what was believed to be a Bolshevik coup. On 29 August, Kerensky made himself commander-in-chief, and ordered Krymov via cable to halt the advance of his troops, some of whom were moving through the southern suburbs of Petrograd. The Soviet executive in the capital now decided to support the now 'Revolutionary Dictator' Kerensky on news of the advance of Krymov's soldiers, and his troops were 'harangued' by Bolsheviks.

Krymov and his staff, travelling on the train of the 1st Don Cossack Division, were halted at Luga by the railway workers, and they continued to be harangued by Soviet deputies. Powerless, Krymov could only watch in his train compartment as Cossacks in large numbers defected to the Soviet side. On 30 August, he agreed to travel with a government representative to Petrograd, and on 31 August, he met with Kerensky, where he tried to explain that he had only brought his troops in an attempt to defend the government, but Kerensky ordered him to trial by military court.

Death
Despondent after the meeting with Kerensky, Krymov left for a friend's apartment, where he was heard saying: "The last card for saving the Fatherland has been beaten – life is no longer worth living." He retired to a private room where he wrote a short note to Kornilov, before he shot himself through the heart.

Honours and awards
 Order of St. Stanislaus, 3rd class (1898), 2nd class with Swords (1905)
 Order of St. Vladimir, 4th class with Swords (1905), 3rd class (19 April 1911)
 Order of St. Anne, 4th class (1905), 3rd class with Swords and Bow (1905), 2nd class with Swords (1906)
 Order of St. George, 4th class (26 June 1916)
 Gold Sword for Bravery (8 November 1914).

References

Bibliography
 
Krymov's biography 

1871 births
1917 deaths
Imperial Russian Army generals
Russian generals
Russian Provisional Government generals
Russian military personnel who committed suicide
Russian anti-communists
Russian counter-revolutionaries
Russian people of World War I
People of the Russian Civil War
Recipients of the Order of St. Vladimir, 3rd class
Recipients of the Order of St. Anna, 2nd class
Recipients of the Gold Sword for Bravery
Suicides by firearm in Russia